Do Ab or Dow Ab or Du Ab or Doab or Dowab or Duab, meaning "two rivers", may refer to:
Do Ab, Bamiyan, a village in Bamiyan Province, Afghanistan
Do Ab (Iran), a rural area near Tehran, Iran
Do Ab, Gilan, a village in Gilan Province, Iran
Do Ab Mardakh, a village in Gilan Province, Iran
Do Ab, Hormozgan, a village in Hormozgan Province, Iran
Do Ab, Ilam, a village in Ilam Province, Iran
Do Ab, Shirvan and Chardaval, a village in Ilam Province, Iran
Do Ab, Kangavar, a village in Kermanshah Province, Iran
Do Ab, Ravansar, a village in Kermanshah Province, Iran
Doab, Sahneh, a village in Kermanshah Province, Iran
Do Ab, Masjed Soleyman, a village in Masjed Soleyman County, Khuzestan Province, Iran
Do Ab-e Bala, a village in Andimeshk County, Khuzestan Province, Iran
Do Ab-e Huran, a village in Andimeshk County, Khuzestan Province, Iran
Doab, Kohgiluyeh and Boyer-Ahmad, a village in Kohgiluyeh and Boyer-Ahmad Province, Iran
Do Ab-e Kalus, a village in Kohgiluyeh and Boyer-Ahmad Province, Iran
Do Ab, Lorestan, a village in Lorestan Province, Iran
Do Ab, Markazi, a village in Markazi Province, Iran
Do Ab, Mazandaran, a village in Mazandaran Province, Iran
Do Ab, Nowshahr, a village in Mazandaran Province, Iran
Bala Do Ab, a village in Savadkuh County, Mazandaran Province, Iran
Pain Do Ab, a village in Savadkuh County, Mazandaran Province, Iran
Do Ab Training Camp, Savadkuh County, Mazandaran Province
Do Ab, North Khorasan, a village in North Khorasan Province, Iran
Do Ab, Tehran, a village in Tehran Province, Iran
Do Ab, West Azerbaijan, a village in West Azerbaijan Province, Iran
Do Ab prison, a prison in Panjshir, Afghanistan
Doab, a geographical feature in India
Doab Rural District (Chaharmahal and Bakhtiari Province), Iran
Doab Rural District (Lorestan Province), Iran
Do Ab-e Mikh-e Zarrin, Afghanistan
Do Ab-e Valian, Afghanistan
Dow Ab-e Zivdar, Iran
Du Ab District, Afghanistan